The 2021 Women's Twenty20 Cup, known for sponsorship reasons as the 2021 Vitality Women's County T20, was the 12th cricket Women's Twenty20 Cup tournament, taking place in April and May, with 36 teams taking part: 34 county teams plus Scotland and Wales. There was no overall winner, with Hertfordshire, Nottinghamshire, Lancashire, Kent, Gloucestershire and Somerset winning their respective regions.

The 2020 tournament was cancelled due to the COVID-19 pandemic and, following a restructuring of women's cricket in England that saw the ending of the Women's County Championship, the Twenty20 Cup was the only nationwide tournament featuring county sides in 2021. The tournament will be followed by competitions involving regional teams, in 50-over and Twenty20 formats, as well as The Hundred.

Competition format

Teams played matches within a series of regional divisions. Matches were played using a Twenty20 format. There was no overall winner, as no stage further to the regional group stage was scheduled.

The groups worked on a points system with positions being based on total points. Points were awarded as follows:

Win: 4 points. 
Tie: 2 points. 
Loss: 0 points.
Abandoned/Cancelled: 1 point.

Teams

The 2021 Women's Twenty20 Cup was divided into 6 regional groups. Teams played 8 matches, across 4 'double-header' matchdays, playing their opponents twice on one day. The teams were divided as follows:

Standings

East Group

Source: ECB Women's Twenty20 Cup

East Midlands Group

Source: ECB Women's Twenty20 Cup

North Group

Source: ECB Women's Twenty20 Cup

South East Group

Source: ECB Women's Twenty20 Cup

South West Group

Source: ECB Women's Twenty20 Cup

West Midlands Group

Source: ECB Women's Twenty20 Cup

Fixtures

East Group

East Midlands Group

North Group

South East Group

South West Group

West Midlands Group

Statistics

Most runs

Source: CricketArchive

Most wickets

Source: CricketArchive

References

Women's Twenty20 Cup
 
2021 in Scottish cricket
cricket
cricket